The Bristol and Exeter Railway Fairfield was an experimental broad gauge self-propelled steam carriage. In later use the carriage portion was removed and it was used as a small shunting locomotive.

Fairfield
The steam carriage was built to the design of William Bridges Adams at Fairfield Works in Bow, London. It was tested on the West London Railway late in 1848, although it was early in 1850 before modifications had been made that allowed Adams to demonstrate that it was working to the agreed standards. The design was not perpetuated by the Bristol and Exeter Railway, instead they purchased small 2-2-2T locomotives for working their branch lines.

It worked on the Clevedon and Tiverton branches, although it might have spent some time on the Weston branch too.

The power unit had a single pair of driving wheels driven through a jackshaft by small  cylinders, the steam produced in a vertical boiler. The boiler was not covered by a cab or other bodywork; the two pairs of carrying wheels were beneath the carriage portion. It had seats for 16 first class and 32 second class passengers.

It was numbered 29 in the Bristol and Exeter Railway locomotive list but generally referred to as "the Fairfield locomotive".

Adams built another couple of steam railmotors at around the same time, but the concept did not catch on. It was revived around the turn of the century and the Great Western Railway built up a fleet of around 100 bogie rail motors. These were developed into an autotrain system whereby the driver of a locomotive could control the train from a cab in the carriage, the forerunner of today's the familiar multiple unit trains.

Shunting locomotive
The carriage portion was removed in 1851 and the power unit rebuilt, presumably with a new pair of carrying wheels making it an 0-2-2. Its use for the next few years is unclear, although it might have been moved to Taunton to pump water.

It was sold to Messrs Hutchinson and Ritson in 1856, the engineering contractors who were working on the Somerset Central Railway. Before delivery, the Bristol and Exeter Railway had to rebuild it as an 0-4-0. The price agreed was £600, paid in prepared timber.

See also 
 Adams axle

References

External links

 The GWR Steam Railmotor Project

Broad gauge (7 feet) railway locomotives
0-4-0 locomotives
Railmotors
Bristol and Exeter Railway locomotives
British steam railcars
Scrapped locomotives